KOZE-FM (96.5 FM) is a radio station broadcasting an album oriented rock format. Licensed to Lewiston, Idaho, United States, the station serves the Lewiston area. The station is currently owned by Lee and Angie McVey's McVey Entertainment Group, LLC, and features programming from ABC Radio.

References

External links

OZE-FM